The Warnman, also spelt Wanman,  are an Aboriginal Australian people of Western Australia's Pilbara region.

Country
Their southern boundary lies around the McKay Range and the area of Kumpupintil Lake. Westwards, it reaches Wadurara on the Rudall River (Karlamilyi). The northern frontier lays in the vicinity of Lake Dora/Walerelere, Mendidjildjil and Karbardi, while they are present eastwards as far as the George, Wooloomber and Auld lakes. The change from their beloved claypan lakes country (tjapipodari] to mulga terrain in the south marked a limit beyond which they thought danger lay.

Language

Ecology
As often natural features can mark a kind of informal boundary between tribes. With the Wanman, that boundary in the south is delineated by the transition from their clumpy porcupine grassland to the thick mulga shrubland of the Kartudjara. The onset of drought would push them northwest, to around Karbardi and Pulburukuritji, and Kalamilji. Their harsh almost treeless sandhill landscape is mostly devoid of larger game like emu and kangaroo, though the hare wallaby and opossum, if caught, would provide some meat. Its poor grassland constrains the Wanman to develop grass-milling in order to eke out food from seeds, one of the few Australian tribes, such as the Ualarai and the Pila Nguru, who resort to this technique A list of the primary foods was provided to Norman Tindale by one tribesman:
 Their main cereal food came from threshing and winnowing Triodia grass seed
 Cyperus bulbs could be harvested from clay flats lying between the sand-dunes sometime after heavy rains had fallen
 Hare wallaby were hunted down with a throwing stick
 Brushtail possum
 Porcupines
 Cossid moth grubs found on shrub roots
 Pig weevil grubs
 Lizards such as the sleepy lizard
 Black goanna, and sand goannas
 Sandhill frogs found after rain sweeps the desert
 Ducks were elusive but their eggs, laid after the rains, were prized

Portulaca seeds, once harvested, were worked in stone-rings
The kitibaru also served as a digging stick to forage for marsupial moles. String spun from animals or hair, worn around the waist, was used to lasso lizards, and then hitch them to a string belt to bring back to the campsite.

Social organisation
The Warnman were probably divided into six groups or clans, each with its own wells. Such estates gave exclusive wood-cutting rights to each member of the group but Warnman from all clans had equal access to the major watering holes (wongal) Drought would at times force them into Nyangumarta land where, in exchange for water, they would be constrained to hand over their women in marriage. The Nyangumarta themselves would often raid the Warnman in order to secure wives.

History of contact
The extreme conditions of desert life pressed the Wanman to develop techniques to harvest food from grasses and this traditional knowledge served them well as they moved towards the coast, since they could quickly adapt their skills to glean buffel or afghan grass, which had seeded into the landscape from imported camel saddles and was in demand as a fodder grass in arid zones.

Alternative names
 Wanmanba. (Mandjildjara exonym)
 Wanmin.
 Nanidjarara. (contemptuous exonym used of them by the Kartudjara and others. The Wanman applied, in turn, this word to the Nangatara.)
 Nenidjara.
 Njanidjara.
 Warumala (Mangala exonym, used generally in the area, with a basic sense of 'foreigner/stranger'.)

Notes

Citations

Sources

Aboriginal peoples of Western Australia
Canning Stock Route
Mid West (Western Australia)